Franklin Edmundo Rijkaard (born 30 September 1962) is a Dutch former footballer and former manager who played as a defensive midfielder. Rijkaard played for Ajax, Real Zaragoza and AC Milan and represented the Netherlands national team side 73 times, scoring 10 goals. In his managerial career, he was at the helm of the Netherlands national team, Sparta Rotterdam, Barcelona, Galatasaray and the Saudi Arabia national team.

Regarded as one of the best midfielders in footballing history,  Rijkaard was described by British broadsheet The Daily Telegraph as having been "a stylish player of faultless pedigree".

Playing career

Ajax
Rijkaard was born in Amsterdam. His father Herman (1935–2010) was a Surinamese footballer who arrived in the Netherlands along with the father of Ruud Gullit and his mother Neel is Dutch; the two sons grew up playing together in the city. Rijkaard was just 17 when Ajax coach Leo Beenhakker gave him his senior squad debut on 23 August 1980. He made an immediate impact, scoring the third goal in a 4–2 away victory over Go Ahead Eagles, the first league match in the 1980–81 season. He would play another 23 games for Ajax in his first season, netting four goals. In 1981–82, he won his first league championship with Ajax and went on to successfully defend the title the following season.

Rijkaard stayed at Ajax for seven-and-a-half seasons. During this period, he won the Dutch league championship three times (1981–82, 1982–83, 1984–85) and the Dutch Cup three times (1982–83, 1985–86, 1986–87). In the 1986–87 season, he won the Cup Winners' Cup with Ajax over Lokomotiv Leipzig, winning 1–0. In September 1987, what would have been Rijkaard's third season (1987–88) under Dutchman Johan Cruyff as head coach, Rijkaard stormed off the training field and vowed never to play under him again. He was subsequently signed by Sporting CP, but he signed too late to be eligible to play in any competition. He was immediately loaned out to Real Zaragoza, but upon completing his first season at Zaragoza was signed by AC Milan.

AC Milan
Rijkaard played for five seasons at Milan. It was coach Arrigo Sacchi who saw Rijkaard as playing a pivotal role at Milan and transformed the central defender into a world class holding midfielder, where the Dutchman's aggressive and firm style would go on to influence the likes of Patrick Vieira to replicate in future years. Playing alongside fellow country-men Marco van Basten and Ruud Gullit, Rijkaard won the European Cup twice (in 1989 against Steaua București and 1990, against Benfica) and the domestic Serie A championship twice. In the 1990 European Cup Final, he scored the only goal to win the cup for Milan.

Return to Ajax
After five seasons in Italy, Rijkaard returned to Ajax in 1993. With Louis van Gaal at the helm, Rijkaard and Danny Blind formed the experienced defensive core of the Ajax team that won the first two of three consecutive Dutch championships. Ajax were the unbeaten champions of the Netherlands in the 1994–95 season, and carried that success into Europe. In his final game, Rijkaard won the Champions League with a 1–0 victory over Milan in the 1995 final at the Ernst-Happel-Stadion in Vienna. He was named in the FIFA 100, Pelé's list of the 125 World's Greatest Footballers.

International career

On the international stage, Rijkaard made his debut for the Netherlands in 1981. He was part of the Dutch side that won UEFA Euro 1988 with a 2–0 win in the final over the Soviet Union, playing at centre-back alongside Ronald Koeman. He won a total of 73 caps and scored 10 goals. Rijkaard also played for the Netherlands during the 1990 and 1994 FIFA World Cups and at Euro 1992.

At Euro 1992, Rijkaard scored a late equalizer for the Netherlands in a 2–2 draw with Denmark at the semi-final stage but the Dutch went out on penalties. He made his final appearance for the Netherlands in the 3–2 defeat against eventual winners Brazil in the quarter-finals of the 1994 World Cup.

Spitting incident

Rijkaard was the cause of an incident with Rudi Völler when West Germany played the Netherlands in the 1990 World Cup. Rijkaard was booked for a tackle on Völler and, as Rijkaard took up position for the free kick, he spat in Völler's hair. Völler complained to the referee and was booked as well. From the resulting free kick, Völler then handled the ball and then went to the ground (according to his own account) to avoid a collision with Dutch keeper Hans van Breukelen, while others, notably Rijkaard and van Breukelen, saw Voller's handball and his resulting action as a dive in hopes for a penalty. Van Breukelen was angry at this but Rijkaard, already annoyed by Völler's previous antics, again confronted the West German by twisting his ear and stamping on his foot. Argentine referee Juan Carlos Loustau was tired of both Völler and Rijkaard's consistently hostile antics towards each other in such a short period of time, and fearing a fight between the two, sent off both Rijkaard and Völler. As he jogged back to the entrance tunnel, Rijkaard again spat in Völler's hair as they left the pitch. The German press nicknamed him "Llama" for his spitting. Rijkaard would later apologise for his behaviour to Völler, who accepted.

Style of play
Regarded as one of the greatest players in his position, Rijkaard was a quick, strong, complete and tenacious defensive midfielder who was praised by pundits throughout his career for his physical and athletic attributes, his work rate, positioning, his acute tactical intelligence and decision-making, as well as his outstanding consistency and ability to read the game. Due to his aggression and versatility, he was also capable of playing as a central or box-to-box midfielder, and even in a defensive role, usually in the centre. Although Rijkaard was known as a strong tackler, he was surprisingly elegant for a player of his size, and also possessed good technique, passing ability, link-up play, and vision, which made him adept at starting attacking plays as a deep-lying playmaker once he won back possession; because of his technical skills and creative abilities, he was also capable of playing in more advanced roles, as an attacking midfielder or second striker. Due to his height and physical strength, he excelled in the air, and also possessed a powerful shot; furthermore, he was capable of getting forward and contributing to his team's attacking plays with goals by making late runs into the penalty area.

Managerial career

Early years
Rijkaard's coaching career began when he was appointed manager of the Netherlands national team in 1998. He had previously served as an assistant coach, along with Johan Neeskens and Ronald Koeman under the managerial tenure of Guus Hiddink. At the time, he was not taken seriously as a manager because of his inexperience, but he was able to guide his national side to the semi-finals of Euro 2000. During the group phase, the Dutch team won slowly but surely and managed to get three victories: 1–0 against the Czech Republic, 3–0 against Denmark and 3–2 against France. In the quarter-final, his side produced the biggest win of the competition, a 6–1 result against Yugoslavia. The Netherlands played some of the best football of the tournament, but lost their semi-final match to Italy on penalties; Rijkaard resigned immediately.

During the 2001–02 season, he became manager of Sparta Rotterdam in the Eredivisie, the oldest professional team in the country. Rijkaard enjoyed the down-to-earth atmosphere, although the club was not financially strong. Under his leadership, the club was relegated to the second division for the first time in its history, and he was consequently sacked.

Barcelona

First years
Rijkaard was not out of a coaching role for long, and less than a year after leaving Sparta, he was appointed manager of Barcelona for the 2003–04 season, with Albert Roca as the assistant coach. The season would prove to be a watershed for the club, but not without initial instability. Rijkaard arrived at the club as it entered a new phase, having elected a new president in Joan Laporta and a new managerial board, but with fans unhappy that Laporta had let English midfielder David Beckham snub the chance to join the club. For Rijkaard, the team he inherited, with the exception of new superstar signing Ronaldinho (who was the club's second choice after Beckham), also consisted of many underachieving players from the old guard and era that failed to meet the club and its fans' demands to match archrival Real Madrid's success in the early 2000s, having not won a trophy since 1999.

Rijkaard had a disappointing start at Barcelona that saw some sections of the club's fans call for his resignation, and he drew flak from the media when the team lost to Real Madrid in December 2003. Rijkaard's resilience won through and from 2004 onwards, he achieved a massive turnaround, as the team went from strength to strength. Barcelona finished runners-up in La Liga in 2003–04, having been close to the relegation zone at one point in the earlier stages of the season. Rijkaard then took Barcelona to the next level as he phased out the old guard and rebuilt a new-look side around Ronaldinho, with new players like Deco, Samuel Eto'o, Rafael Márquez and Ludovic Giuly, along with the latest promotion of some young players from the previous era trained in the club's youth teams, including Víctor Valdés, Lionel Messi and Andrés Iniesta. He eventually succeeded in turning around the fortunes of the club, with the strong support of Laporta, and within the next couple of years finally managed to win La Liga both in 2004–05 and in 2005–06.

Champions League title and after

Rijkaard became the first Barcelona coach to have won twice at Real Madrid's Santiago Bernabéu Stadium, an achievement which even successful managers like Johan Cruyff, Louis van Gaal and Luis Aragonés were unable to accomplish. His no-nonsense policy on and off the field, and the sparkling football played by his team, won him many plaudits and Rijkaard was among the five nominated coaches for UEFA's Team of the Year 2005. On 8 March 2006, he was also honoured by UEFA for his contributions to the European Cup competition throughout his career as player and manager.

Rijkaard also achieved success on the European stage, winning the 2005–06 Champions League with a 2–1 win against Arsenal in the final. Barcelona had been losing 1–0 for most of the match before his late tactical substitutions proved the decisive factor, as the introduction of Henrik Larsson and Juliano Belletti contributed directly to Barcelona's two goals. The win made him the fifth individual to have won the European Cup both as a player and as a manager, alongside Miguel Muñoz, Giovanni Trapattoni, Johan Cruyff and Carlo Ancelotti, a feat later achieved also by his eventual successor, Pep Guardiola and then Zinedine Zidane.

After losing to Manchester United in the semi-final of the 2007–08 Champions League, Rijkaard was asked whether he would quit at the end of the season, since he had not won anything for two successive seasons. He replied, "I have no intention of leaving. It would be different if the players were saying it is time for me to go but that is not the case." On 1 May 2008, it was reported that Rijkaard allegedly confided to a colleague that he would be stepping down as Barcelona manager at the end of the season, but 24 hours later, he stated in a press conference that he had no intention of leaving the club.

On 8 May 2008, the day after Barcelona's dismal 4–1 defeat to archrivals Real Madrid, Barcelona president Joan Laporta announced that at the end of the 2007–08 season, Rijkaard would no longer be head coach of the first team. Laporta made the announcement after a board meeting, and Rijkaard was succeeded by Pep Guardiola. Laporta made it clear that Rijkaard's achievements "made history" and praised him for his time at the club.

Galatasaray

On 5 June 2009, Rijkaard signed a two-year contract to manage the Turkish Süper Lig team Galatasaray, following the resignation of Bülent Korkmaz two days earlier. He was sacked on 19 October 2010 and was replaced with Gheorghe Hagi.

Saudi Arabia
On 28 June 2011, it was announced that Rijkaard would be head coach of the Saudi Arabia national team after a deal was reached with the Saudi Arabia Football Federation. Saudi Arabia were eliminated in the third round of 2014 FIFA World Cup qualification after a 4–2 away defeat to Australia in their last match on 29 February, finishing third in their group.

The 21st Arabian Gulf Cup was the second competition for Rijkaard with Saudi Arabia. The Saudis left the competition at the group stage after losing 2–0 against Iraq, a 2–0 win against Yemen and 1–0 defeat against Kuwait. On 16 January 2013, Rijkaard was dismissed under a confidential contractual termination penalty clause following Saudi Arabia's exit at the tournament.

Later career
In 2013, Florida prep school Montverde Academy hired Rijkaard as their advisor of player development.

In December 2016, Rijkaard announced he would no longer pursue a position as manager.

Coaching philosophy and style
As a coach, Rijkaard's essential philosophy is to guide his team towards playing attack-minded football as a cohesive unit. In doing this, he believes a team can achieve the dual objectives of winning games and ensuring the audience's enjoyment of the spectacle. This follows in the best coaching traditions of Rijkaard's countrymen and forebears Rinus Michels and Johan Cruyff. In this light, it is notable that Michels coached both Cruyff and Rijkaard during their respective participations with the Dutch national team, and that Cruyff himself went on to coach Rijkaard. Nonetheless, Rijkaard believes in working within a contemporary football context and is not out to imitate the styles and tactics of past masters. In his own words: 

Rijkaard has evidently learned to curb the quick temper of his playing days and is often a portrait of calm and stability in training and along the touchline. He rarely courts controversy in the media and is more apt now to promote a positive environment and let his team's play speak for itself when faced with intense rivalry or criticism. The tactics used during his tenure as manager of Barcelona best exemplify Rijkaard's commitment to playing stylish attacking football. During the team's 2004–05 and 2005–06 campaigns, the coach frequently fielded a 4–3–3 formation, a system which encouraged the flair and creativity of the players in the front third of the field and created optimal interplay between the midfielders and forwards during attacks, with Ronaldinho being the focal point of the team's offence. Within this system, the four defenders also tended to play in a relatively high position on the pitch to support the midfield, which frequently advanced to participate in the attack. The team generally focuses on maintaining possession in the opponents' half of the field, applying pressure in order to force the opposition to make errors in defense and offensive counter-attacking.

Personal life
Rijkaard comes from a football-playing family. He is the son of Herman Rijkaard, a former footballer who played for SV Robinhood in the Surinamese Hoofdklasse, before emigrating to the Netherlands, where he played in the Dutch Eredivisie for FC Blauw-Wit. His older brother, Herman Rijkaard, Jr., is a FIFA certified players' agent who represents various players internationally. Twice divorced, he is currently married to Stephanie and has four children.

Media
Rijkaard features in EA Sports' FIFA video game series; he was featured in the FIFA 14, FIFA 15, FIFA 16 and FIFA 17 Ultimate Team Legends. For FIFA 18, FIFA 19, FIFA 20, FIFA 21 , FIFA 22 and FIFA 23 he appeared as an ICON player in FIFA Ultimate Team (FUT).

Career statistics

Club

International

Scores and results list the Netherlands' goal tally first, score column indicates score after each Rijkaard goal.

Managerial statistics

Honours

Player
Source:

Ajax
 Eredivisie: 1981–82, 1982–83, 1984–85, 1993–94, 1994–95
 KNVB Cup: 1982–83, 1985–86, 1986–87
 Dutch Supercup: 1993, 1994
 UEFA Champions League: 1994–95
 European Cup Winners' Cup: 1986–87

AC Milan
 Serie A: 1991–92, 1992–93
 Supercoppa Italiana: 1988
 European Cup: 1988–89, 1989–90
 European Super Cup: 1989, 1990
 Intercontinental Cup: 1989, 1990

Netherlands
 UEFA European Championship: 1988

Individual
 Dutch Golden Shoe: 1985, 1987
 UEFA European Championship Team of the Tournament: 1988
 Ballon d'Or – Third place: 1988, 1989
 Intercontinental Cup Most Valuable Player of the Match Award: 1990
 Serie A Best foreign player: 1992
 Serie A Footballer of the Year: 1992
 ESM Team of the Year: 1994–95
 FIFA 100
 UEFA Golden Jubilee Poll: #21
 UEFA President's Award: 2005
 AC Milan Hall of Fame
 World Soccer: The 100 Greatest Footballers of All Time
 Ballon d'Or Dream Team (Silver): 2020

Manager
Barcelona
 La Liga: 2004–05, 2005–06
 Supercopa de España: 2005, 2006
 UEFA Champions League: 2005–06

Individual
 Don Balón Coach of the Year: 2004–05, 2005–06
 UEFA Manager of the Year: 2005–06
 UEFA Team of the Year for Best Coach of the Year: 2006
 IFFHS World's Best Club Coach: 2006
 European Coach of the Year—Alf Ramsey Award: 2006
 Onze d'Or Coach of the Year: 2006

Notes

References

External links

 Frank Rijkaard at Voetbal International 
 
 
  
  

1962 births
Living people
Footballers from Amsterdam
Dutch sportspeople of Surinamese descent
Dutch expatriate footballers
Dutch footballers
Netherlands international footballers
AFC DWS players
AFC Ajax players
Sporting CP footballers
Real Zaragoza players
A.C. Milan players
Serie A players
La Liga players
Eredivisie players
Expatriate footballers in Italy
Expatriate footballers in Portugal
Expatriate footballers in Spain
UEFA Euro 1988 players
1990 FIFA World Cup players
1994 FIFA World Cup players
UEFA Euro 1992 players
UEFA European Championship-winning players
Association football central defenders
Association football midfielders
Association football utility players
Dutch football managers
Dutch expatriate football managers
Netherlands national football team managers
UEFA Euro 2000 managers
Sparta Rotterdam managers
FC Barcelona managers
Galatasaray S.K. (football) managers
Eredivisie managers
La Liga managers
Expatriate football managers in Spain
Süper Lig managers
Expatriate football managers in Turkey
Saudi Arabia national football team managers
UEFA Champions League winning managers
FIFA 100
Dutch expatriate sportspeople in Italy
Dutch expatriate sportspeople in Turkey
UEFA Champions League winning players
Association football coaches